Outpost (2002) is a collaborative album by electronic musicians Robert Rich and Ian Boddy. Recording of this album began during a week in October, 2001 while Boddy was visiting Rich’s studio in California. It was completed in November when Rich visited Boddy’s studio in Northern England. It was mixed, assembled and mastered by Robert Rich in January, 2002. The track titles follow a science fiction theme of space exploration. This album was released as a limited edition of 2000 copies.

Track listing
”First Outpost” – 1:31
”Ice Fields” – 8:21
”Methane” – 3:48
”Lagrange Point” – 6:48
”Link Lost” – 10:15
”State of Flux” – 6:38
”Tuning In” – 5:47
”Tuning Out” – 6:54
”Edge of Nowhere” – 6:25
”Last Outpost” – 2:18

Personnel
Robert Rich – MOTM modular synthesizer, lap steel guitar, flutes, percussion
Ian Boddy – analog and digital synthesizers, prepared piano, Metasynth, Pluggo

References

External links
album feature from Robert Rich’s official web site

Robert Rich (musician) albums
2002 albums
Collaborative albums